Kuurdak (Qýyrdaq, ; Говурдак), transliterated with various spellings, is a traditional meat dish made in Central Asia. The name comes from a nominalisation of the word "roast", "fried", referring to how the food is made. It is described as "stewed brown meat".

Kuurdak is one of the main and oldest dishes in Kyrgyz cuisine. Kuurdak is usually made from mutton, fat/oil and onion, it can be made using beef or any other kind of meat. In Kazakh cuisine kuurdak is made from sheep's liver, kidney, heart and lungs.

Kuurdak is known in Turkish cuisine as kavurma usually made from lamb, mutton, beef or sheep liver or sometimes with vegetables.

See also
 List of lamb dishes
 List of Uzbek dishes

References

Further reading
Kuurdak description and etymology

Kyrgyz cuisine
Soviet cuisine
Kazakhstani cuisine
Uzbekistani cuisine
Lamb dishes
National dishes
Turkmenistan cuisine
Mongolian cuisine